"Yuvarlandim" is a Turkish, Karachays, Altai people in folkloric tune (Türkü); danced also in the past by the Karamanlides, Greeks of Anatolia: Cappadocian Greeks and others.

Original form
The original form of the türkü was popular in Cappadocia.

See also
Tropanka
Chukano horo
Kaşık Havası
Ballos
Syrtos

References

Turkish songs
Songwriter unknown
Year of song unknown